Jilian Medford, better known by her stage name Ian Sweet, is an American indie rock musician from Los Angeles, California.

History
As Ian Sweet, Medford has released three full-length albums. The first album, Shapeshifter, was released in 2016 via Hardly Art. The album was listed at number 33 on Stereogum list of the "50 Best Albums of 2016". Ian Sweet was also listed as one of Stereogum best new bands of 2016. In 2018, Medford followed up her debut with her second full-length album titled Crush Crusher, also on Hardly Art. The album received a 3.5 out of 5 rating from Rolling Stone. 

Medford's third full-length album, Show Me How You Disappear, was released on March 5, 2021.

Discography
Studio albums
Shapeshifter (2016, Hardly Art)
Crush Crusher (2018, Hardly Art)
Show Me How You Disappear (2021, Polyvinyl)

References

Hardly Art artists
Musicians from Los Angeles
Year of birth missing (living people)
Living people